Chip and Potato is an animated children's television series created by Billy Macqueen, Catherine Williams, and Maddy Darrall. The series is co-produced by MCC Media and Darrall Macqueen.

The series follows Chip, a young pug who faces challenges in kindergarten and Potato, her snuggly "toy" who is secretly a living mouse. It first premiered on Family Jr. on October 15, 2018. The first twenty episodes (released as two segments per episode) of the series were released on Netflix on Friday 17th May 2019. The second half, labeled as a second season, was released on Netflix on Friday 29th November 2019 and Family Jr. A third season premiered on Tuesday 8th March 2022 on Netflix. Season 4 premiered on 3rd October 2022 on Netflix.

Plot
Chip and Potato is about Chip, a young little pug who faces big challenges and embarks on the new stages of her life. There to help and comfort Chip whenever she needs it is her best friend Potato, a toy who she snuggles in her pocket. However, Potato is actually a real, living mouse who must be kept a secret.

Characters

Main characters
 Chip Pug (voiced by Abigail Oliver; Ava Talbot in the UK dub in season 1 and Megan Heavey in season 2 and onwards in the UK dub), is a friendly, curious, and big-hearted five-year-old pug girl. She is Nico's best friend and Potato's BFF.
 Potato (voiced by Andrea Libman) is Chip's best friend, who is a tiny mouse. Potato keeps herself a secret to everyone else; she appears as a toy when anyone else is around, except for Chip. She gives Chip security and confidence and is her BFF.

Supporting characters
 Spud Pug (voiced by Chance Hurstfield; Sam Day in the UK dub and Ben Riley in season 2 and onward in the UK dub) is Chip's older brother. His relationship with his sister is healthy and often gives advice to his sister when she's having trouble. Spud enjoys skateboarding.
 Little Momma Pug (voiced by Briana Buckmaster; Kate Harbour in the UK dub) is Chip's mother. Formerly a receptionist, she is now a stay at home mother after having her third puglet, Totsy Tot.
 Little Poppa Pug (voiced by Brian Dobson; Wayne Forester in the UK dub) is Chip's father. He is a police officer and does most of the house work like cooking whenever he's off-duty.
 Nico Panda (voiced by Dominic Good) is a panda and Chip's best friend. By the end of season one, he is one of few people who knows about Potato's secret.
 Totsy Tot Pug is Chip's baby sister. Despite getting off on the wrong foot, Chip adores her little sister and even gave her the name "Totsy Tot". Totsy is one of the few characters Potato shows her true self around.
 Grandma Pug (voiced by Christina Jastrzembska) is Chip's grandmother. Grandma Pug does not live with Chip and her family and often makes visits, but she enjoys seeing her family whenever she has the chance. However in the second season, she and her husband moved into Welcome Walk for their new business.
 Stomp and Stamp Fant (voiced by Evan Byarushengo and Scotia Andersen) are a pair of twin elephants. They are Chip's friends and neighbors. Stomp and Stamp enjoy doing things together and are rarely seen apart.
 Amanda Panda (voiced by Teryl Rothery) is Nico's mother. She raises both of her sons in Welcome Walk. Her husband Andy does not live with her and travels the world to help people decorate their homes as his job, but he and Amanda still love each other. 
 Bodi Panda is Nico's baby brother. Bodi is one of the few who's aware of Potato's secret, Potato occasionally plays with him whenever they're alone.
 Mr. Diggerty (voiced by Alessandro Juliani) is the kindergarten teacher of Rainbow Forest School and teaches Chip's class. He is a fair and dedicated teacher and makes sure that his class is fun and fair for his students. In the Thanksgiving special, his first name is revealed to be "Desmond".
 Gigglish Grand (voiced by Emma Jayne Maas) is a giraffe and is one of Chip's friends and neighbors. She's a sporty giraffe and enjoys any form of outdoor activity. She's seen doing cartwheels.
 Howie Hyena (voiced by Brenden Sunderland) is a hyena. He is mischievous kindergartener at Rainbow Forest School. He likes blowing raspberries and always causes trouble. Despite this, he has a softer side and cares.
 Gordie Pug (voiced by Garry Chalk) is a pug and Grandma Pug's husband. They got married in the second season of the show, he moved into Welcome Walk with her. Gordie is also a magician.
 Glenda (voiced by Naomi Tan) is a dalmatian and Gordie's granddaughter.

Production
Chip and Potato is co-produced by WildBrain Studios in Canada and Darrall Macqueen in the United Kingdom. The series' target demographic is for children under seven years old. Maddy Darrall, the co-founder and co-MD at Darrall Macqueen, told C21 regarding the series that "series arcs in preschool animation are simply not done; we want to prove they should be."

A British dub by Adrenaline Studios was released on the same day the series debuted on Netflix.

Episodes

Season 1 (Season 1 & 2 on Netflix)

Season 2 (Season 3 and 4 on Netflix) 

 Fairground Chip
 Chip, Meet Mrs. Whale
 Chip and Glenda
 Chip, the Picnic Entertainer
 Chip's Haircut
 Chip's Sleepaway T-shirt
 Tot's New Bed
 Chip's Cake Bake
 Kevin Comes to Stay
 Tot's First Birthday
 Chip and Potato: Flying Chip
 Chip and Potato: Chip's Holiday
 Bridespup Chip
 Chip and Nico's Fun Day
 Chip is Sorry
 Grandma and Gordie's Taqueria
 Flingo's Show
 Boo-bam's School Visit
 Tot and Potato
 Howie Has Heart
 Wedding Rehearsal Chip
 Grandma and Gordie's Big Puggy Wedding
 Chip and Potato: Chip's Thanksgiving

Broadcast
Chip and Potato first premiered on Family Jr. in Canada on October 15, 2018. The series was released to Netflix worldwide as a "Netflix original" on May 17, 2019.

References

External links
  on Family Jr.
 
 

2010s British animated television series
2018 British television series debuts
British children's animated television shows
British flash animated television series
2010s Canadian animated television series
2018 Canadian television series debuts
Canadian children's animated television series
Canadian flash animated television series
English-language Netflix original programming
Animated television series about dogs
Animated television series about mice and rats
Animated television series about children
Family Jr. original programming
Netflix children's programming
Television series by DHX Media
Animated television series by Netflix